Gordon M. Williams (20 June 1934 – 20 August 2017) was a British author. Born in Paisley, Renfrewshire, he moved to London to work as a journalist. He wrote for television and was the author of more than 20 novels, including From Scenes Like These (1968), shortlisted for the Booker Prize in 1969, Walk Don't Walk (1972) and Big Morning Blues (1974). Other novels include The Camp (1966), The Man Who Had Power Over Women (1967) and The Upper Pleasure Garden (1970).

He was a ghostwriter for the autobiographies of association footballers Bobby Moore, Terry Venables and manager Tommy Docherty.

Williams' National Service with the RAF in Germany informed his second published novel, The Camp. In 1971, his novel The Siege of Trencher's Farm was controversially filmed as Straw Dogs. Sam Peckinpah's cinematic treatment marked a watershed in the depiction of sexual violence in the cinema though the most controversial scenes are absent from the book. Other film work includes The Man Who Had Power Over Women, from his own novel, and Tree of Hands, as scriptwriter from a Ruth Rendell novel. Williams also wrote the book of Ridley Scott's film The Duellists.

In 1976 film producer Harry Saltzman employed Williams to rewrite the script for The Micronauts. Although the film was never made, Williams' novelisation was published in 1977; he subsequently wrote two sequels.

While working as commercial manager of association football club Chelsea, he renewed his collaboration with Venables, resulting in four co-written novels. From the novels grew the 1978 TV series Hazell, which the pair co-wrote under the shared pseudonym P. B. Yuill. Under the name Jack Lang, Williams also wrote paperbacks "for £300 a time".

Williams declined director Bill Forsyth's invitation to write the script for the 1981 film Gregory's Girl.

He died on 20 August 2017 at the age of 83.

Bibliography
Non-fiction
A Hundred Years of Protest and Progress, official history of the London Trades Council, 1860–1960; 1960
Acker Bilk, biography; May Fair Books, 1962

Novels
The Last Day of Lincoln Charles; London: Secker & Warburg, 1965; New York: Stein & Day, 1966
The Camp; London: Secker & Warburg, 1966; Allison & Busby, 1980
The Man Who Had Power Over Women; London: Secker & Warburg, 1967; New York: Stein & Day, 1967
The Hard Case (as Jack Lang); Mayflower, 1968
From Scenes Like These; London: Secker & Warburg, 1968; New York: William Morrow, 1969; London: Allison & Busby, 1980 (in Growing up in the West, Canongate, 2003)
The Biter (as Jack Lang); Mayflower, 1968
The Siege of Trencher's Farm (filmed as Straw Dogs); London: Secker & Warburg, 1969; New York: William Morrow, 1969
The Upper Pleasure Garden; London: Secker & Warburg, 1970; New York: William Morrow, 1970
Walk Don't Walk; London: Quartet, 1973, Allison & Busby, 1980; New York: St Martin's Press, 1972
The Bornless Keeper (as P. B. Yuill); Macmillan, 1974
Big Morning Blues; London: Hodder & Stoughton, 1974
The Duellists (novelisation of Ridley Scott film based on screenplay by Gerald Vaughan-Hughes); London: Fontana, 1977
Pomeroy, an American Diplomat; London: Michael Joseph, 1983

With Terry Venables
They Used to Play on Grass; London: Odhams, 1972
Hazell Plays Solomon (as P. B. Yuill); Penguin, 1977
Hazell and the Three Card Trick (as P. B. Yuill); Penguin, 1977
Hazell and the Menacing Jester (as P. B. Yuill); Penguin, 1977

Ghosted
The Book of Soccer, edited by Bobby Moore;
Denis Law's Book of Soccer;
The Book of Soccer (Bobby Moore);
My Soccer Story by Bobby Moore (autobiography);
Thirteen Against the Bank, by Norman Leigh; Penguin, 1977

Science fiction
The Micronauts: New English Library, 1977; Bantam Books, August 1977
The Microcolony: Bantam Books, 1979; U.K. title: Micronaut World; New English Library, June 1981
Revolt of the Micronauts: Bantam Books, 1981; New English Library, 1981

Contributor
 "The Horseshoe Inn", in Prevailing Spirits: A Book of Scottish Ghost Stories (Giles Gordon, ed.): Hamish Hamilton, 1976

References

External links
 
 D. J. Taylor, "Gordon who?" (interview), The Guardian, 22 October 2003.

1934 births
2017 deaths
Writers from Paisley, Renfrewshire
Scottish novelists
Scottish science fiction writers